The 2nd Macau International Movie Festival ceremony, organized by the Macau Film and Television Media Association and China International Cultural Communication Center, honored the best films of 2010 in the Greater China Region and took place on  December 7, 2010, at the Venetian Macao, in Macau.

A Tibetan Love Song won three awards and Wild Strawberries won two awards.

Winners and nominees

References

External links
 2nd Macau International Movie Festival Sina

Golden Lotus Awards
Macau
2010 in Macau
Gold